Šťáhlavy is a municipality and village in Plzeň-City District in the Plzeň Region of the Czech Republic. It has about 2,900 inhabitants.

Administrative parts
The village of Šťáhlavice is an administrative part of Šťáhlavy.

Geography
It is located in the Švihov Highlands on the Úslava River.

History
The first written mention of Šťáhlavy is from 1239. In 1784–1789 the Waldschloss Castle, later renamed Kozel, was built.

In 1947 Šťáhlavy was incorporated to the Plzeň-Country District and in 1960 to the newly arisen Plzeň-South District. Since 1 January 2007 it is a part of the Plzeň-City District.

Sights
Šťáhlavy is known for two castles. Kozel Castle is a Neoclassical building surrounded by a large park. Today it is open to the public.

Šťáhlavy Castle was originally a fortress from the mid-16th century, later expanded into a Renaissance Castle. The castle is privately owned and inaccessible.

References

External links

Villages in Plzeň-City District